Glasgow Peggie or Glasgow Peggy is Child ballad 228 (Roud 95), existing in several variants.

Synopsis

A Highlander comes to steal Peggie.  In most variants, her father (and in some, her mother), declare that he might steal their animals, but not their daughter.  He carries her off anyway.

A few variants end there.

Some also include either her parents or a local earl regretting that he got away with it.

Peggie laments their harsh conditions.  The Highlander assures her, or shows her, that he has plenty of property, and is, indeed, a lord (often the lord of Skye), and makes her his lady.  Some variants explicitly include that he is richer than her parents.

See also
Bonny Lizie Baillie
Lizie Lindsay
Dugall Quin
The Beggar-Laddie

External links
Glasgow Peggie

Child Ballads
Year of song unknown
Songwriter unknown